John MacGill was a Scottish rugby union player. He became a referee and later was  the 54th President of the Scottish Rugby Union. His regular playing position was Full back.

Rugby Union career

Amateur career

MacGill played for Glasgow Academicals, he usually played at full back; but in the early days of his career he started as a forward.

MacGill played in Glasgow Academicals own Sevens competition in 1908.

MacGill played matches for his army battalion. One such match was the 2/9th Highland Light Infantry (Glasgow Highlanders) versus 15th Argyll and Sutherland Highlanders played on 22 January 1916 at Old Anniesland.

Provincial career

MacGill played for Glasgow District against Edinburgh District in the 1907 inter-city match. The Herald newspaper reports that the Edinburgh back T. Sturrock, the brother of John Sturrock, had a bad game but this was due to the brilliance of MacGill.

MacGill's best chance of pressing for international selection was the Cities District versus Provinces District match in January 1908. Macgill started as Full Back for Cities.

MacGill's opposite number in the Provinces side Douglas Schulze had a better game and outshone Macgill, although both players played well. One black mark against Macgill was his defending against Alex Purves; on one occasion Purves seemed to slip through his fingers on his way to scoring a try. Schulze and Purves received the Scotland call-ups, not Macgill.

Referee career

MacGill refereed in the Scottish Unofficial Championship.

MacGill refereed in the Border League.

MacGill refereed the Blues Trial versus Whites Trial match in 1928.

Administrative career

MacGill was Honorary Secretary of Glasgow Academicals in 1914–15.

MacGill was Vice-President of the SRU in 1932. He opened the stand at Jock's Lodge, the home of Royal HSFP that year.

MacGill was elected President of the SRU in 1933.

MacGill was included in the Scotland travelling party to Ireland for their Five Nations Championship match in 1939.

Outside of rugby

MacGill served in the army in the First World War as a captain of the Highland Light Infantry.

MacGill began a career in shipping; first with James Rankine and Son in Glasgow. That company joined with George Gibson & Co. Ltd, a Leith shipping firm, and he became a director of George Gibson & Co. on the merger.

MacGill succeeded R. A. Somerville as a member of the Leith Dock Commission. He represented the Chamber of Shipping as an advisory board member for new works of the Northern Lighthouse Commissioners. He was also on the Forth Conservancy Board representing shipowners.

Death
He died in an Edinburgh nursing home on 20 November 1941.

His estate was worth £48,663.

References

1941 deaths
1880s births
Border League referees
Cities District players
Glasgow Academicals rugby union players
Glasgow District (rugby union) players
Presidents of the Scottish Rugby Union
Rugby union players from Grangemouth
Scottish Districts referees
Scottish rugby union players
Scottish rugby union referees
Scottish Unofficial Championship referees